Thomas Zevgaras (born January 16, 2001) is a Greek college basketball player for the Incarnate Word Cardinals of the NCAA Division I. He is a 2.07 m (6'9 ") tall power forward-center.

College career
Zevgaras began playing college basketball in the United States, at the University of the Incarnate Word, with the Incarnate Word Cardinals, in 2020.

Professional career
Zevgaras began his pro career in 2019, during the 2018–19 season, with the Greek Basket League club Olympiacos. For the 2019–20 season, he was assigned to play on loan in the Greek 2nd Division, with Pagrati.

National team career
Zevgaras played with the junior national teams of Greece. With Greece's junior national team, he played at the 2016 FIBA Under-16 European Championship.

References

External links
EuroLeague Under-18 Profile
FIBA Profile
Eurobasket.com Profile
Greek Basket League Profile 
RealGM.com Profile
DraftExpress.com Profile

2001 births
Living people
Centers (basketball)
Greek men's basketball players
Olympiacos B.C. B players
Olympiacos B.C. players
Pagrati B.C. players
Power forwards (basketball)
Sportspeople from Karditsa